Namayanja is a surname. Notable people with the surname include: 

 Florence Namayanja (born 1960), Ugandan politician
 Rose Namayanja (born 1975), Ugandan lawyer, author, and politician

Surnames of African origin